Toiano may refer to:

Toiano, Palaia, a village in the province of Pisa, Italy
Toiano, Pozzuoli, a village in the Metropolitan City of Naples, Italy
Toiano, Sovicille, a village in the province of Siena, Italy
Toiano, Vinci, a village in the Metropolitan City of Florence, Italy